Johnny Long (September 12, 1914 (disputed) – October 31, 1972) was an American violinist and bandleader, known as "The Man Who's Long on Music". He was raised on a farm in Newell, North Carolina, currently a subdivision of Charlotte. He started practicing with the violin at the age of six, but injured two fingers on his left hand when he was bitten by a pig. He then learned to use his right hand to play the violin, and continued to do so until his death.

Music career
As a freshman at Duke University, Long joined with ten other freshmen to create a school band named The Duke Collegians. He also joined Sigma Nu Fraternity. During their second year, they were adopted as the official school band. The band stayed together throughout their school years and, upon graduation, renamed themselves The Johnny Long Orchestra, with Long as the bandleader. For a number of years they toured the country and were eventually signed on to Vocalion Records (owned by ARC) in 1937 for the release of Just Like That. They performed their first national radio broadcast in 1939 on The Fitch Summer Bandwagon Show, which boosted their national popularity. This resulted in the band being signed on by Decca Records.  His orchestra earned the label "Miracle Band of the Year" thru a series of lengthy engagements at some of the top and locations in the country.

His Johnny Long Orchestra accompanied Ella Fitzgerald on her Decca recording of "Confessin' That I Love You".  He was chosen to play the President's Birthday Ball in Washington in 1942, and also that his has been the only record of "Back Up the Red, White and Blue with God," official song of the Treasury's War Bond Dept.

Under management of Decca, Long released a hit single, "In a Shanty in Old Shanty Town", that resulted in over one million sales. It was awarded a gold disc by the RIAA. This song quickly became the band's signature tune. This song, and numerous other hits, made the band one of the most successful big bands in the country during the 1940s. Other popular covers included "My Dreams Are Getting Better All the Time" and "Poor Butterfly". One of the high points of his career was playing Franklin D. Roosevelts Birthday Ball in April 1941.

However, as the big band style diminished over the years, so did Long's ensemble. Long continued to lead the band, with various members, up until his death in 1972. The cause of death was melanoma. He is buried in the cemetery of King’s Church (formerly Newell Baptist Church) in Charlotte, North Carolina.

Film roles
While being supported by a strong musical following, Johnny Long and his band enjoyed a short film career. Their first big role was in the Abbott & Costello comedy, Hit the Ice, where Long played a romantic male lead opposite Ginny Simms. The same year gave Long his last major movie role in Follies Girl.

See also
 Beauty and the Beach, a 1941 short film

References

1914 births
1972 deaths
American jazz bandleaders
American jazz violinists
Big band bandleaders
American male violinists
20th-century American violinists
Jazz musicians from North Carolina
20th-century American male musicians
American male jazz musicians